Lise with a Parasol is an oil on canvas painting by French artist Pierre-Auguste Renoir, created in 1867 during his early Salon period.  The full-length painting depicts model Lise Tréhot posing in a forest. She wears a white muslin dress and holds a black lace parasol to shade her from the sunlight, which filters down through the leaves, contrasting her face in the shadow and her body in the light, highlighting her dress rather than her face. After having several paintings rejected by the Salon, Renoir's Lise with a Parasol was finally accepted and exhibited in May 1868.

The painting was one of Renoir's first critically successful works.  At this time, Renoir's technique was still influenced by Gustave Courbet, but he continued to develop his unique style painting filtered light which he would return to in The Swing (1876) and Dance at Le Moulin de la Galette (1876).  The almost life-size portrait and unusual contrast in Lise with a Parasol led several critics to ridicule the work.  Théodore Duret, a passionate supporter of the nascent Impressionists, bought the painting from Renoir, who was unable to sell it. Karl Ernst Osthaus, a German patron of avant-garde art, acquired Lise with a Parasol in 1901 for the Museum Folkwang.

Background

In November 1860, Pierre-Auguste Renoir (1841–1919) entered the private studio of Charles Gleyre (1806–1874) and was later admitted to the École des Beaux-Arts in April 1861.  In Gleyre's studio, Renoir became friends with fellow students Claude Monet (1840–1926), Alfred Sisley (1839–1899), and Frédéric Bazille (1841–1870).  During the summer of 1862, Renoir and his friends painted landscapes in the Forest of Fontainebleau, following in the tradition of the Barbizon school before them.  It was in the forest where Renoir first met Narcisse Virgilio Díaz (1807–1876), who, according to popular anecdote, saved Renoir from a vicious beating by using his cane to beat away attackers who were making fun of Renoir's porcelain smock. Renoir and Díaz had shared interests; they both got their start as decorators of porcelain before turning to painting. Díaz helped mentor Renoir, gave him access to art supplies, and influenced and changed his style, discouraging Renoir's overuse of bitumen and leading him to lighten his palette. Art critic Jean Bouret writes: "Diaz, still wearing his old porcelain decorator's smock (like Troyon and Dupré), happened to meet Renoir in a clearing of the forest and recommended to him to use lighter tones, the very advice he himself had been given by Rousseau thirty years earlier.  So a tradition was handed on, and henceforth, it would be the task of other 'sons of light' to bear the torch."

In his research on collaboration and friendship dynamics among the French Impressionists, sociologist Michael P. Farrell notes that the group learned together from their shared successes and failures. The successful application of new knowledge about color Renoir acquired from Díaz was quickly shared with his friends.  Sisley was resistant at first, thinking it was "crazy" to paint colored light ("The idea of making trees blue and the ground purple!") instead of the dark colors used in the classical style they were used to applying.  But after playing around with the idea, Sisley soon embraced the new practice, and it was shared with Monet and Bazille. Renoir's exploratory use of color confirmed what Monet had previously learned from his mentor, Dutch painter Johan Jongkind (1819–1891), a forerunner of Impressionism.  But with the success of these experiments also came failures, which were still influential. Monet's experiment with large format painting and his failure with Luncheon on the Grass (1865–1866) greatly influenced the close group of friends, with Monet's style helping to inform Renoir's approach to Lise with a Parasol in 1867.

Around 1865, Renoir met Lise Tréhot through his friend, former architect and painter Jules Le Coeur, who was involved in a relationship with Clémence, Lise's sister. Jules was featured in two of Renoir's works in 1866, Mother Anthony's Tavern and Jules Le Coeur in Fontainebleau Forest.  From around 1865 to 1872, Lise modeled for Renoir and was his lover and companion during his early Salon period. Meanwhile, Renoir continued to face rejection at the Salon with Paysage avec deux figures (1866) and Diana (1867), two works featuring Lise as a model. Renoir's innovative work brought great ridicule and poverty, as he was unable to sell his paintings.  He survived by devoting himself to painting portraits for wealthy patrons like the Le Coeur family.  For about a decade, Renoir painted portraits and still lifes for the Le Coeur's and received a commission from Jules's brother Charles (Charles Le Coeur, 1874) to paint decorations on the ceiling for a town house he was designing for Romanian Prince George Bibescu. Later, in 1874, the Le Coeur's ten year patronage came to an abrupt end when Renoir sent Charles's 16-year-old daughter Marie, (Portrait of Marie Le Coeur, 1870) a love letter, leading to Renoir's permanent ban from the Le Coeur residence. The Le Coeur family were the first collectors of Renoir's work and held on to his paintings until the 1920s. Art historian Douglas Cooper notes, "Like Lise, the Le Coeurs had given moral support and encouragement to Renoir during those bleak years when he was struggling, in the face of poverty and frustration, to overcome the difficulties of allowing his artistic personality and vision to develop. And like Lise, too, they disappear out of Renoir's ambiance just at the moment when his style first attains to maturity and shortly before he was to experience his first worldly successes."

Development

Renoir sold himself as a figure painter during the early Salon period from 1863-1873, where he created large-scale works featuring figures in the outdoors, with only one landscape (Soirée d'été) submitted to the Salon during that entire time.  Before the Impressionists held their first exhibitions in the 1870s, conventional academic art ranked landscape painting lower than history, portraiture, and genre painting. "Despite his attachment to Le Coeur and Marlotte, and to Monet and Sisley", writes art historian Colin B. Bailey, "landscape painting was a secondary endeavor for him."  Oddly enough, Renoir's refusal to identify himself as a landscapist to conform to the academic art demands of the day may have worked against his efforts to sell his paintings, as art dealers like Paul Durand-Ruel were looking to buy landscapes, not figure paintings. 

Renoir began painting Lise with a Parasol in the summer of 1867, possibly in August,  when he was 26 years old.  Previously, it was assumed that Renoir had composed the painting in the Fontainebleau forest,  close to Chailly-en-Brie near Bourron-Marlotte, just like he had done with Mother Anthony's Tavern (1866). More recent scholarship points to Renoir painting the work in the Chantilly Forest of Chantilly, Oise, for two months, from July to August. During this time, Renoir's friend, Edmond Maître (1840–1898), sent a message to Frédéric Bazille (1841–1870) about how Renoir's technique had changed, writing on August 23, 1867, that although Renoir was now in Chantilly, Maître saw him in Paris earlier in the year where Renoir was "painting strange canvases, having traded turpentine for an infamous sulfate and using, instead of a knife, the little syringe that you know." It is unknown if Renoir completed the painting of Lise with a Parasol in the studio or en plein air in the forest. "Even if Renoir largely worked on the painting in the studio", writes art historian Gary Tinterow, "we do not know enough about his practice in the 1860s". In spite of that, Renoir "presented his subjects as plein air painting".

Exhibition

Simply titled Lise, Renoir submitted the painting to the Salon of 1868 and it was accepted where it received positive feedback. It was Renoir's first critically successful work, but according to Tinterow, "the jury had stigmatized Renoir as a rebel, along with Courbet, Manet, and Monet."  The attention Renoir garnered with Lise led the administrators of the Salon to move Lise,  along with paintings by Bazille and Monet, to a remote gallery known as the "rubbish dump" (dépotoir). When Renoir's work was exhibited by the Salon early in his career, it was often skied, a process where his paintings were deliberately hung in areas such as high places and corners where it was difficult for the public to view and would receive the least attention.  Art historian Jane M. Roos notes that "relegating works to the dépotoir was a favorite tactic of the administration, a "humiliation" in Castagnary's words and a sure sign that a painting had displeased the establishment or, perhaps, pleased the public too much."

Description

Lise with a Parasol is a full-length, almost life-size portrait of a young woman, standing in a forest clearing.   She wears a small, pork pie straw hat with red ribbons, and a long white muslin dress with a long black sash; the dress is modestly buttoned to the neck and has long sheer sleeves.  Lise carries a black lace parasol to shade her head while her body is in strong sunlight, standing on a patch of grass. The initials of "A" (Auguste) and "L" (Lise) are marked as an arborglyph on the trunk of the tree in the shade behind her.

Art historian John House notes that the work "explore[s] the borderlines between portraiture and genre painting".   Renoir's decision to name the painting using only the first name of his model indicates, according to House, that this is not a traditional portrait painting, as such works typically used family names or initials. By using Lise's first name as the title, House argues that Renoir was pointing to her status as a mistress (or an unmarried female lover and companion).

Critical reception

In the late 1860s, Renoir was still in the process of developing his own unique style and technique.  Critics noted that Lise with a Parasol, like several of Renoir's earlier paintings, Mother Anthony's Tavern (1866) and Diana (1867), showed the influence of other artists, notably French Realist painter Gustave Courbet. Art historians Lionello Venturi and Jean Leymarie both note the influence of Courbet, particularly from his work Young Ladies of the Village (1852).  The model for the central figure in that painting is Courbet's sister Juliette, who appears in profile holding a parasol in a similar pose to Renoir's Lise.  Critics evoked comparison with previous paintings and artists such as the image of the Symphony in White, No. 1: The White Girl (1861-62) by James Abbott McNeill Whistler, the image of Olympia (1863) by Édouard Manet, and the painting of Camille (1866) by Claude Monet. 

Art critic  Zacharie Astruc and writer Émile Zola both viewed Renoir's Lise with a Parasol as a continuation of Monet's Camille.  Astruc, who was also Renoir's personal friend, described Lise as the "likeable Parisian girl in the woods", and viewed the painting as part of a trinity beginning with  Manet’s Olympia, followed by Camille and ending with Lise with a Parasol. 
There was no major opposition to Lise with a Parasol at the Salon. Art critic Théophile Thoré, an early supporter of the Impressionists, praised the work. Thoré wrote: "The dress of white gauze is in full light, but with a slight greenish cast from the reflection of the foliage. The head and neck are held in a delicate half-shadow under the shade of the parasol.  The effect is so natural and so true that one might very well find it false, because one is used to nature represented in conventional colors, but does not color depend on the environment which surrounds it?"

Tinterow attributes direct criticism of the painting to Renoir's decision to shadow Tréhot's face in darkness and emphasize the reflection of sunlight from her white dress. This unusual contrast was immediately noticed by critics who ridiculed Tréhot's appearance. In Le Salon Pour Rire, French caricaturist André Gill likened Tréhot in Lise with a Parasol to "a nice semisoft cheese out for a stroll", while Ferdinand de Lasteyrie described the painting as "the figure of a fat woman daubed with white".

Provenance

In a letter from Renoir to Frédéric Bazille in September 1869, Renoir writes about his desperation for money: "I exhibited [the portraits of] Lise and Sisley at Carpentier's. I am going to try to stick him for about 100 francs, and I'm going to put my woman in white up for auction. I'll sell it for whatever price it goes for; it's all the same to me."  Renoir was unable to sell the painting.

In 1872, Théodore Duret (1834–1917), now known as "one of the earliest and most ardent defenders" of the Impressionists, met Renoir for the first time through Edgar Degas (1834–1917).  At the time, Duret was not impressed by Renoir's Bohemian approach.  However, Degas praised Renoir's work, which encouraged Duret to seek out his paintings in local galleries.  In March 1873, Duret purchased Renoir's In Summer (1868) for 400 or 500 francs, possibly at an art gallery in Montmartre.  Now interested in what Renoir had to offer, Duret went searching for the artist.  Renoir told Duret that he was unable to pay rent for his studio and needed to quickly sell his paintings.  Duret met with Renoir in his studio and chose to purchase Lise, the painting Duret liked most, on the spot for 1,200 francs.  Before Duret purchased Lise, the canvas was sitting on the floor rolled up because Renoir was forced to sell the stretcher bar. "Nobody wanted the canvas", wrote German art critic Julius Meier-Graefe. 

Duret later sold the painting to Paul Durand-Ruel in Paris on June 5, 1890; German art dealer Paul Cassirer bought it on May 10, 1901. Later that month, on May 23, Karl Ernst Osthaus, a patron of the European avant-garde, paid 18,000 Goldmarks  for Lise with a Parasol and brought it to his Folkwang Museum in Hagen, Germany. The painting was moved to Essen when the museum relocated in 1922 as the Museum Folkwang.

Related work

In May 1878, Duret published Les Peintres Impressionnistes, one of the first historical works about the Impressionist movement.  Renoir made a drawing of Lise with a Parasol for Duret's book and it was used as a frontispiece; it is the only image of a painting from the Impressionist movement in the book.

A sister painting, Portrait of Lise (Lise holding a bouquet of wild flowers) (1867), was completed around the same time as the larger Lise with a Parasol.  In both works, she appears in a forest wearing a similar dress and the same earrings, but in Portrait of Lise she wears a blue rather than a black sash. House notes the thematic and narrative similarity between Lise with a Parasol and La Promenade (1870), as the expectations of the waiting woman in Lise with a Parasol are fulfilled in La Promenade, with the private, romantic rendezvous between lovers in the forest, a popular nineteenth century theme. A later painting, Woman with Parasol Seated in the Garden (1872), features Lise seated, modeling a similar dress with a red sash, hat, and parasol.

Lise with a Parasol was the first of Renoir's paintings to feature a human figure with light filtering through plant leaves from above.  Later works by Renoir that make use of this same style include The Swing (1876) and Bal du moulin de la Galette (1876).

Notes and references 

Notes

References

Bibliography

Further reading

External links

Description at the Museum Folkwang

Portraits by Pierre-Auguste Renoir
Portraits of women
1867 paintings
Collection of the Museum Folkwang
19th-century portraits